FC Haray Zhovkva is an amateur Ukrainian football team based in Zhovkva, Lviv Oblast.

The team spent several years in the Ukrainian Second Division before was relegated at the end of the 1998–99 season along with FC Krystal Chortkiv. On the amateur level Haray has won the cup competition of the Amateur Association in 2002. Currently, the club competes on the regional level in the Lviv Oblast competition with more modest results than in the past.

League and cup history

{|class="wikitable"
|-bgcolor="#efefef"
! Season
! Div.
! Pos.
! Pl.
! W
! D
! L
! GS
! GA
! P
!Domestic Cup
!colspan=2|Europe
!Notes
|-
|align=center|1995–96
|align=center|3rd "A"
|align=center|8
|align=center|40
|align=center|20
|align=center|7
|align=center|13
|align=center|49
|align=center|35
|align=center|67
|align=center|
|align=center|
|align=center|
|align=center|
|-
|align=center|1996–97
|align=center|3rd "A"
|align=center|10
|align=center|30
|align=center|10
|align=center|7
|align=center|13
|align=center|29
|align=center|28
|align=center|37
|align=center|
|align=center|
|align=center|
|align=center|
|-
|align=center|1997–98
|align=center|3rd "A"
|align=center|16
|align=center|34
|align=center|9
|align=center|11
|align=center|14
|align=center|29
|align=center|43
|align=center|38
|align=center|
|align=center|
|align=center|
|align=center|
|-
|align=center|1998–99
|align=center|3rd "A"
|align=center|15
|align=center|28
|align=center|2
|align=center|4
|align=center|22
|align=center|9
|align=center|16
|align=center|4
|align=center|
|align=center|
|align=center|
|align=center bgcolor=pink|Relegated6 pts deducted
|}

 
Amateur football clubs in Ukraine
Sport in Zhovkva
Football clubs in Lviv Oblast
Association football clubs established in 1990
1990 establishments in Ukraine